Claude Bazin de Bezons (1617 – 20 March 1684) was a French lawyer, politician, and second holder of l'Académie française, seat 1.

Biography
Bazin de Bezons was born in Paris, France.  His grandfather, Claude Bazin, married Marie Chanterel in 1580 and was knighted by Louis XIII in 1611, giving him the Lordship of Bezons.

Claude Bazin de Bezons eventually became an attorney at the Grand Conseil, a high French court put in place to rule on contentious legal matters.  In 1643, he was elected member of the Académie française, and eventually became its oldest member.

He served as the intendant (royal administrative head) of justice, police, and finance in Soissons, and then Languedoc from 1654 to 1674, during which he was also commissioned to direct the reorganization of the universities of Toulouse and Montpellier.  After returning to Paris, he was named to the Conseil d'État (Council of State).

He only left a few brief written works, including some speeches and rants, as well as a translation of the Peace of Prague between Ferdinand II and the Prince-Elector of Saxony in 1635.

Children 
Claude Bazin de Bezons was the father of:
  (died 1700), Magistrate
 Jacques (1646–1733), Marshal of France
 Suzanne (1648–1699) married Louis Le Blanc, mother of Secretary of State for War Claude Le Blanc 
  (1654–1721), Archbishop of Rouen and Archbishop of Bordeaux,

References
 Biography from l'Académie française, in French

1617 births
1684 deaths
Politicians from Paris
Lawyers from Paris
Members of the Académie Française